Weldon Spring Heights is a village in St. Charles County, Missouri, United States. The population was 91 at the 2010 census.

Geography
Weldon Spring Heights is located at  (38.705185, -90.686092).

Demographics

2010 census
As of the census of 2010, there were 91 people, 35 households, and 33 families living in the village. The racial makeup of the village was 89.0% White, 9.9% from other races, and 1.1% from two or more races. Hispanic or Latino of any race were 9.9% of the population.

There were 35 households, of which 22.9% had children under the age of 18 living with them, 80.0% were married couples living together, 5.7% had a female householder with no husband present, 8.6% had a male householder with no wife present, and 5.7% were non-families. 2.9% of all households were made up of individuals, and 2.9% had someone living alone who was 65 years of age or older. The average household size was 2.60 and the average family size was 2.64.

The median age in the village was 55.5 years. 15.4% of residents were under the age of 18; 7.7% were between the ages of 18 and 24; 3.3% were from 25 to 44; 40.7% were from 45 to 64; and 33% were 65 years of age or older. The gender makeup of the village was 54.9% male and 45.1% female.

2000 census
As of the census of 2000, there were 79 people, 32 households, and 27 families living in the town. The racial makeup of the town was 100.00% White. Hispanic or Latino of any race were 2.53% of the population.

There were 32 households, out of which 21.9% had children under the age of 18 living with them, 75.0% were married couples living together, 6.3% had a female householder with no husband present, and 15.6% were non-families. 12.5% of all households were made up of individuals, and 9.4% had someone living alone who was 65 years of age or older. The average household size was 2.47 and the average family size was 2.67.

In the town the population was spread out, with 20.3% under the age of 18, 3.8% from 18 to 24, 20.3% from 25 to 44, 34.2% from 45 to 64, and 21.5% who were 65 years of age or older. The median age was 46 years. For every 100 females, there were 107.9 males. For every 100 females age 18 and over, there were 103.2 males.

The median income for a household in the town was $60,625, and the median income for a family was $78,644. Males had a median income of $38,750 versus $43,750 for females. The per capita income for the town was $25,627. There were no families and 4.9% of the population living below the poverty line, including no under eighteens and 8.0% of those over 64.

References

Villages in St. Charles County, Missouri
Villages in Missouri